Richard Aquila is an American philosopher, currently the co-editor of Kantian Review and formerly a Distinguished Humanities Professor at University of Tennessee.

References

Year of birth missing (living people)
Living people
University of Tennessee faculty
Philosophers from Tennessee
Northwestern University alumni